Following is a list of Lebanese restaurants:

 Aladdin's Eatery
 Boustan
 Habibi Restaurant, Portland, Oregon, U.S.
 Hoda's, Portland, Oregon
 The Middle East
 Newport Restaurant
 Nicholas Restaurant, Portland metropolitan area
 TarBoush, Portland, Oregon
 Ya Hala, Portland, Oregon
 Zankou Chicken

Lebanese